Abhijit Sen  is Emeritus Scientist and INSA fellow,Sr. Professor , Institute for Plasma Research, Chandrasekhar Chair .

Education 

Sen got National Merit Scholarship Government of India (1962–66) . Young Scientist award Indian National Science Academy (1978) .Sen did his Bachelor of Science from Gujarat University in Physics (1963) Master of Science and Doctor of Philosophy in Physics from University of Tennessee in 1971 . Postdoctoral researcher in Oak Ridge National Laboratory .

Award and honours 
Sen has got many awards 

 Young Scientist award from Indian National Science Academy
 Fellow, Gujarat Science Society
 Fellow of Indian Academy of Sciences
 Fellow of National Academy of Sciences, India
 Fellow of Indian National Science Academy
 Fellow of American Physical Society
 Fellow of Institute of Physics
 Senior Associate of International Centre for Theoretical Physics

Membership and Chair 
Sen is member of many organisations 

 Chairman of International Union of Pure and Applied Physics
 Chairman of board of governors Indian Institute of Geomagnetism
 Member Editorial board of Plasma Sources Science and Technology ,Plasma Physics and Controlled Fusion ,Nuclear Fusion (journal) ,Pramana (journal) ,Indian Journal of Physics
 Member Academic Council Visva-Bharati University Indian Institute of Geomagnetism
 Member Science and technology advisory committee ITER

Published work 
Sen has published more than 300 research paper in reputed journal,

References

Living people
1943 births
Indian physicists
Indian plasma physicists
Plasma physicists
Fellows of the American Physical Society